In Hamiltonian mechanics, a canonical transformation is a change of canonical coordinates  that preserves the form of Hamilton's equations. This is sometimes known as form invariance. It need not preserve the form of the Hamiltonian itself. Canonical transformations are useful in their own right, and also form the basis for the Hamilton–Jacobi equations (a useful method for calculating conserved quantities) and Liouville's theorem (itself the basis for classical statistical mechanics).

Since Lagrangian mechanics is based on generalized coordinates, transformations of the coordinates  do not affect the form of Lagrange's equations and, hence, do not affect the form of Hamilton's equations if we simultaneously change the momentum by a Legendre transformation into

Therefore, coordinate transformations (also called point transformations) are a type of canonical transformation. However, the class of canonical transformations is much broader, since the old generalized coordinates, momenta and even time may be combined to form the new generalized coordinates and momenta.  Canonical transformations that do not include the time explicitly are called restricted canonical transformations (many textbooks consider only this type).

For clarity, we restrict the presentation here to calculus and classical mechanics.  Readers familiar with more advanced mathematics such as cotangent bundles, exterior derivatives and symplectic manifolds should read the related symplectomorphism article.  (Canonical transformations are a special case of a symplectomorphism.)  However, a brief introduction to the modern mathematical description is included at the end of this article.

Notation
Boldface variables such as  represent a list of  generalized coordinates that need not transform like a vector under rotation, e.g.,

A dot over a variable or list signifies the time derivative, e.g.,

The dot product notation between two lists of the same number of coordinates is a shorthand for the sum of the products of corresponding components, e.g.,

The dot product (also known as an "inner product") maps the two coordinate lists into one variable representing a single numerical value.

Indirect approach
The functional form of Hamilton's equations is

By definition, the transformed coordinates have analogous dynamics

where  is a new Hamiltonian (sometimes called the Kamiltonian) that must be determined.

In general, a transformation  does not preserve the form of Hamilton's equations. Since restricted transformations have no explicit time dependence (by definition), the time derivative of a new generalized coordinate  is

where  is the Poisson bracket.

We also have the identity for the conjugate momentum Pm

If the transformation is canonical, these two must be equal, resulting in the equations

The analogous argument for the generalized momenta Pm leads to two other sets of equations

These are the indirect conditions to check whether a given transformation is canonical.

Liouville's theorem
The indirect conditions allow us to prove Liouville's theorem, which states that the volume in phase space is conserved under canonical transformations, i.e.,

By calculus, the latter integral must equal the former times the Jacobian 

where the Jacobian is the determinant of the matrix of partial derivatives, which we write as

Exploiting the "division" property of Jacobians yields

Eliminating the repeated variables gives

Application of the indirect conditions above yields .

Generating function approach

Both sets of variables must obey Hamilton's principle. That is the Action Integral over the Lagrangian  and  respectively, obtained by the Hamiltonian via ("inverse") Legendre transformation, both must be stationary (so that one can use the Euler–Lagrange equations to arrive at equations of the above-mentioned and designated form; as it is shown for example here):

One way for both variational integral equalities to be satisfied is to have

Lagrangians are not unique: one can always multiply by a constant  and add a total time derivative  and yield the same equations of motion (see for reference: b:Classical Mechanics/Lagrange Theory#Is the Lagrangian unique.3F).

Here  is a generating function of one old canonical coordinate ( or ), one new canonical coordinate ( or ) and (possibly) the time .  Thus, there are four basic types of generating functions (although mixtures of these four types can exist), depending on the choice of variables. As will be shown below, the generating function will define a transformation from old to new canonical coordinates, and any such transformation  is guaranteed to be canonical.

Type 1 generating function
The type 1 generating function  depends only on the old and new generalized coordinates

To derive the implicit transformation, we expand the defining equation above

Since the new and old coordinates are each independent, the following  equations must hold

These equations define the transformation  as follows.  The first set of  equations

define relations between the new generalized coordinates  and the old canonical coordinates . Ideally, one can invert these relations to obtain formulae for each  as a function of the old canonical coordinates.  Substitution of these formulae for the  coordinates into the second set of  equations

yields analogous formulae for the new generalized momenta  in terms of the old canonical coordinates .  We then invert both sets of formulae to obtain the old canonical coordinates  as functions of the new canonical coordinates .  Substitution of the inverted formulae into the final equation 

In practice, this procedure is easier than it sounds, because the generating function is usually simple.  For example, let 

This results in swapping the generalized coordinates for the momenta and vice versa 

This example illustrates how independent the coordinates and momenta are in the Hamiltonian formulation; they are equivalent variables.

Type 2 generating function
The type 2 generating function  depends only on the old generalized coordinates and the new generalized momenta

where the  terms represent a Legendre transformation to change the right-hand side of the equation below.  To derive the implicit transformation, we expand the defining equation above

Since the old coordinates and new momenta are each independent, the following  equations must hold

These equations define the transformation  as follows.  The first set of  equations

define relations between the new generalized momenta  and the old canonical coordinates . Ideally, one can invert these relations to obtain formulae for each  as a function of the old canonical coordinates.  Substitution of these formulae for the  coordinates into the second set of  equations

yields analogous formulae for the new generalized coordinates  in terms of the old canonical coordinates . We then invert both sets of formulae to obtain the old canonical coordinates  as functions of the new canonical coordinates .  Substitution of the inverted formulae into the final equation 

In practice, this procedure is easier than it sounds, because the generating function is usually simple.  For example, let 

where  is a set of  functions.  This results in a point transformation of the generalized coordinates

Type 3 generating function
The type 3 generating function  depends only on the old generalized momenta and the new generalized coordinates 

where the  terms represent a Legendre transformation to change the left-hand side of the equation below.  To derive the implicit transformation, we expand the defining equation above

Since the new and old coordinates are each independent, the following  equations must hold

These equations define the transformation  as follows. The first set of  equations

define relations between the new generalized coordinates  and the old canonical coordinates .  Ideally, one can invert these relations to obtain formulae for each  as a function of the old canonical coordinates.  Substitution of these formulae for the  coordinates into the second set of  equations

yields analogous formulae for the new generalized momenta  in terms of the old canonical coordinates . We then invert both sets of formulae to obtain the old canonical coordinates  as functions of the new canonical coordinates .

In practice, this procedure is easier than it sounds, because the generating function is usually simple.

Type 4 generating function
The type 4 generating function  depends only on the old and new generalized momenta

where the  terms represent a Legendre transformation to change both sides of the equation below.  To derive the implicit transformation, we expand the defining equation above

Since the new and old coordinates are each independent, the following  equations must hold

These equations define the transformation  as follows. The first set of  equations

define relations between the new generalized momenta  and the old canonical coordinates .  Ideally, one can invert these relations to obtain formulae for each  as a function of the old canonical coordinates.  Substitution of these formulae for the  coordinates into the second set of  equations

yields analogous formulae for the new generalized coordinates  in terms of the old canonical coordinates .  We then invert both sets of formulae to obtain the old canonical coordinates  as functions of the new canonical coordinates .  Substitution of the inverted formulae into the final equation 

Motion as a canonical transformation
Motion itself (or, equivalently, a shift in the time origin) is a canonical transformation.

since a valid trajectory  should always satisfy Hamilton's principle, regardless of the endpoints.

Examples 
 The translation  where  are two constant vectors is a canonical transformation. Indeed, the Jacobian matrix is the identity, which is symplectic: .
Keeping in mind that special orthogonal matrices obey  it's easy to see that the Jacobian is symplectic. Be aware that this example only works in dimension 2:  is the only special orthogonal group in which every matrix is symplectic.

Modern mathematical description
In mathematical terms, canonical coordinates are any coordinates on the phase space (cotangent bundle) of the system that allow the canonical one-form to be written as

up to a total differential (exact form). The change of variable between one set of canonical coordinates and another is a canonical transformation.  The index of the generalized coordinates  is written here as a superscript, not as a subscript as done above.  The superscript conveys the contravariant transformation properties of the generalized coordinates, and does not mean that the coordinate is being raised to a power.  Further details may be found at the symplectomorphism article.

History
The first major application of the canonical transformation was in 1846, by Charles Delaunay, in the study of the Earth-Moon-Sun system. This work resulted in the publication of a pair of large volumes as Mémoires by the French Academy of Sciences, in 1860 and 1867.

See also
 Symplectomorphism
 Hamilton–Jacobi equation
 Liouville's theorem (Hamiltonian)
 Mathieu transformation
 Linear canonical transformation

References

Hamiltonian mechanics
Transforms